Gino Paoli (born 23 September 1934 in Monfalcone) is an Italian singer-songwriter. He is a seminal figure who has written a number of songs widely regarded as classics in Italian popular music, including: "Il cielo in una stanza", "Che cosa c'è", "Senza fine", "Quattro amici al bar" and "Sapore di sale".

Biography
Paoli was born in Monfalcone, a little town near Trieste, but moved to Genoa at a young age.

After several different jobs, he was signed to Dischi Ricordi with friends and fellow musicians Luigi Tenco and Bruno Lauzi. His first success was the single "La Gatta", which has been used in Italian language teaching classes in American middle schools and high schools.

"Il cielo in una stanza" was composed in 1959. According to Paoli, the lyrics came to him while lying on a brothel bed. Gazing at the purple ceiling, he thought, "Love can grow at any moment at any place". Mina's single release of the song topped the list of annual sales in Italy and reached Billboard Hot 100. Video performances of the song were included in the movies "Io bacio... tu baci" and "Appuntamento a Ischia". Later it was featured in the "Goodfellas" movie. Carla Bruni Sarkozy covered the song (mixing French with her native Italian) in her debut album ("Quelqu'un m'a dit").

Gino Paoli's debut album – Gino Paoli was released in Italy on 8 October 1961 on Dischi Ricordi.

"Il cielo in una stanza" success was followed by "Sapore di sale" (1963), arranged by Ennio Morricone and believed to be his most famous song.  In the same year he attempted suicide by shooting himself to the heart (the bullet is still inside his chest).

In 1974 he returned with the LP I semafori rossi non-sono Dio, followed by Il mio mestiere (1977). Both showed a more mature inspiration than his 1960s works. In the 1980s Paoli produced a series of successful albums, and in 1985 he toured Italy together with Ornella Vanoni.

In 1987 he was elected to the Italian Chamber of Deputies for the Italian Communist Party. He abandoned politics in 1992 to pursue his music ambitions.

He had a long relationship with actress Stefania Sandrelli. Their daughter, Amanda Sandrelli, is also an actress.

During an interview in February 2015, when the journalist cited a famous phrase of an Italian minister saying that taxes are a good thing, Gino Paoli insulted him. At the time Paoli was under investigation for tax evasion, accused of having brought 2 million € of untaxed income to a Swiss bank. The singer was acquitted in 2016 due to prescription of the crime.

Discography

Studio albums
 Gino Paoli (1961)
 Le cose dell'amore (1962)
 Basta chiudere gli occhi (1964)
 Gino Paoli allo Studio A (1965)
 Le canzoni per "Emmeti" (1966)
 Gino Paoli and The Casuals (1967)
 Le due facce dell'amore (1971)
 Rileggendo vecchie lettere d'amore (1971)
 Amare per vivere (1972)
 I semafori rossi non-sono Dio (1974)
 Ciao, salutime un po' Zena (1975)
 Le canzoni di Gino Paoli' (1976, collection)
 Il mio mestiere (1977)
 La ragazza senza nome (1978)
 Il gioco della vita (1979)
 Ha tutte le carte in regola (1980)Averti addosso (1984)La luna e il Sig. Hyde (1984)Insieme (1985)Cosa farò da grande (1986)Sempre (1988)L'ufficio delle cose perdute (1988)Gino Paoli '89 dal vivo (1990, live)Matto come un gatto (1991)Senza contorno solo... per un'ora (1992)King Kong (1994)Amori dispari (1995)Appropriazione indebita (1996)Pomodori (1998)Per una storia (2000)Se (2002)Una lunga storia (2004)Ti ricordi? No non-mi ricordo (2004)Gino Paoli & Arsen Dedic u Lisinskom (2005)

Singles
1959 – La tua mano/Chiudi (Dischi Ricordi, SRL 10.047)
1959 – Dormi/Non occupatemi il telefono (Dischi Ricordi, SRL 10.048)
1959 – La notte/Per te (Dischi Ricordi, SRL 10.074)
1959 – Dediceato a te/Senza parole (Dischi Ricordi, SRL 10.075)
1960 – La gatta/Io vivo nella luna (Dischi Ricordi, SRL 10.114)
1960 – Co-eds/Maschere (Dischi Ricordi, SRL 10.115)
1960 – Il cielo in una stanza/Però ti voglio bene (Dischi Ricordi, SRL 10.116)
1960 – Grazie/Volevo averti per me (Dischi Ricordi, SRL 10.130)
1960 – Sassi/Maschere (Dischi Ricordi, SRL 10.161)
1961 – Un uomo vivo/In un caffè (Dischi Ricordi, SRL 10.177)
1961 – Un vecchio bambino/Tu prima o poi (Dischi Ricordi, SRL 10.209)
1961 – Gli innamorati sono sempre soli/Senza fine (Dischi Ricordi, SRL 10.197)
1961 – Un delitto perfetto d'amore/Me in tutto il mondo (Dischi Ricordi, SRL 10.208)
1962 – Le cose dell'amore/Due poveri amanti (Dischi Ricordi, SRL 10.256)
1962 – Devi sapere/Non andare via (Dischi Ricordi, SRL 10.260)
1962 – Una di quelle/Anche se (Dischi Ricordi, SRL 10.291)
1963 – Le cose dell'amore / Domani (RCA Italiana, PM45 3181)
1963 – Sapore di sale / La nostra casa (RCA Italiana, PM45-3204)
1963 – Che cosa c'è / Sarà così (RCA Italiana, PM45-3234)
1964 – Ieri ho incontrato mia madre / Ricordati (RCA Italiana, PM45-3244)
1964 – Vivere ancora / Ricordati (RCA Italiana, PM45-3274)
1964 – Lei sta con te / Vivere ancora (RCA Italiana, PM45-3284)
1965 – Sarà lo stesso / Prima di vederti (RCA Italiana, PM45-3304)
1965 – Rimpiangerai rimpiangerai / Il poeta (RCA Italiana, PM45-3310)
1966 – Un uomo che vale/Sempre (CGD, N 9603)
1966 – La carta vincente/La vita è un valzer (CGD, N 9607)
1966 – A che cosa serve amare/Due ombre lunghe (CGD, N 9611)
1967 – Il mondo in tasca/Io che sarei (CGD, N 9655)
1968 – Se Dio ti da/Dormi (Durium, CN A 9271)
1968 – I giorni senza te/La vita è come un ring (Durium, CN A 9286)
1969 – Come si fa/Monique (Durium, CN A 9305)
1969 – Albergo a ore/Il tuo viso di sole (Durium, CN A 9314)
1970 – Un po' di pena/Accadde così (Durium, CN A 9324)
1971 – Con chi fai l'amore Mimì/Mamma mia (Durium, Ld A 7735)
1972 – Non si vive in silenzio/Amare per vivere (Durium, Ld A 7754)
1973 – Un amore di seconda mano/Amare inutilmente (Durium, Ld A 7808)
1975 – La ragazza senza nome/È facile amarti (Durium, Ld A 7882)
1977 – Parole d'amore/Madama malinconia (Durium, Ld A 7981)
1980 – Tu no/Livorno (RCA Italiana, PB 6533)
1984 – Una lunga storia d'amore/I cinque sensi (Five Record, FM 13065)
1985 – Ti lascio una canzone/Coppi (Five Record, FM 13102)
1986 – Da lontano/Tema di Anna (Five Record, FM 13145)
1991 – La Bella e la bestia (Wea)

References

External links

1934 births
Living people
People from Monfalcone
Italian composers
Italian male composers
Italian male singer-songwriters
Italian singer-songwriters
Italian lyricists
Italian Communist Party politicians
20th-century Italian politicians